Xylota cuprina is a species of hoverfly in the family Syrphidae.

Distribution
India.

References

Eristalinae
Insects described in 1885
Taxa named by Jacques-Marie-Frangile Bigot
Diptera of Asia